Manny Villafaña (born 1940 in New York City, to Puerto Rican immigrants), he attended Cardinal Hayes High School in the Bronx. He began his medical career in 1964 at medical-device exporter Picker International.  In 1967, he was hired away from Picker by Earl Bakken, CEO of Medtronic to become their first international sales administrator.

Business 
In 1971 he co-founded Cardiac Pacemakers Inc.(CPI) with Anthony Adducci, Arthur Schwalm, and James Baustert, each with experience in a different aspect of the pacemaker business. All four had built their careers at Medtronic. The founding partners had multiple lawsuits by and against Medtronic, all settled out of court. CPI was a CRM company that revolutionized the pacemaker industry by introducing a long life lithium iodine pacemaker, a technology still utilized by a majority of the market.

In 1976, he founded St. Jude Medical where his team engineered the first bileaflet mechanical heart valve, which reduced the frequency of blood clots in patients. It still dominates the mechanical valve replacement market.

In 1982, Villafana founded GV Medical, which developed a device to open blood vessels open.

In 1987, he founded Helix BioCore, which eventually transformed into ATS Medical, a company that developed a bi-leaflet valve which uses an open-pivot design to reduce clots and improve blood flow.

Then in 2000, he launched CABG Medical to pursue the creation of an artificial graft for coronary bypass surgery. The company closed in 2006.

In 2007, he launched Kips Bay Medical, a medical device company that focuses on proprietary external saphenous vein support technology for use in coronary artery bypass grafting (CABG) surgery.

Awards 
 2017 Bronx Walk of Fame.
 2010 Induction into the Minnesota Science and Technology Hall of Fame
 2006 Ellis Island Medal of Honor
 2006 Living Legend of Medicine Award from the World Society of Cardiothoracic Surgeons
 2003 Minnesota Business Hall of Fame
 1998 Grand Prize Recipient - Mediterranean Institute of Cardiology
 1993 Boys and Girls Club of America Hall of Fame
 1990 National Entrepreneur of the Year Award in the Master category

Speaking engagements 
2009, 2011 Advances in Cardiothoracic Surgery ACTS
2012 International Society of Minimally Invasive Cardiothoracic Surgery ISMICS

References

External links 
 http://www.kipsbaymedical.com/about-us/our-founder

American business executives
Living people
1940 births